Krasa Rossii (Russian:The Beauty of Russia) is one of the national beauty pageant in Russia that sends the country's representatives to the Miss Earth pageant. The pageant also sent representatives at Miss Asia Pacific/International in the past, other being Miss Russia

History

The pageant was established in 1995 and one of the two longest-running beauty contests in Russia.

Titleholders

Wins by regions 
 This tally contains regions winning the Krasa Rossii title only and not the Miss Earth Russia title.

Miss Earth representatives 
The Miss Earth pageant began in 2001 and since then 2008, Krasa Rossii sends usually their winners to Miss Earth pageant.

Notes:
No representatives were sent in 2002–2004 and 2007.

References

External links

  

Beauty pageants in Russia
Recurring events established in 1995
Russian awards